UNV may refer to:

The United Nations Volunteers
The United Nations Office in Vienna (UNOV), one of the four major UN office sites
U.N.V. (band), an R&B group
 University Park Airport, whose FAA LID is UNV.